The Men's 4 × 10 kilometre relay competition at the FIS Nordic World Ski Championships 2019 was held on 1 March 2019.

Results
The race was started at 13:15.

References

Men's 4 x 10 kilometre relay